The Austria national football team represents Austria in men's international football competition and it is controlled by the Austrian Football Association.

Austria has qualified for seven FIFA World Cups, most recently in 1998. The country played in the UEFA European Championship for the first time in 2008, when it co-hosted the event with Switzerland, and most recently qualified in 2020.

History

Pre-World War II
The Austrian Football Association ("ÖFB") was founded on 18 March 1904 in the Austro-Hungarian Empire. Max Scheuer, a Jewish defender who played for the Austria national football team in 1923, was subsequently killed during the Holocaust in Auschwitz concentration camp. The team enjoyed success in the 1930s under coach Hugo Meisl, becoming a dominant side in Europe and earning the nickname "Wunderteam". The team's star was Matthias Sindelar. On 16 May 1931, they were the first continental European side to defeat Scotland. In the 1934 FIFA World Cup, Austria finished fourth after losing 1–0 to Italy in the semi-finals and 3–2 to Germany in the third place play-off. 

They were runners-up in the 1936 Olympics in Germany, again losing to Italy 2–1, despite having been beaten in the quarter-finals by Peru, following the Peruvians' withdrawal. However, according to an investigation, the surprise victory by Peru was deliberately annulled by Adolf Hitler to favour the Austrians.

The team then qualified for the 1938 World Cup finals, but Austria was annexed to Germany in the Anschluss on 12 March of that year. On 28 March, FIFA was notified that the ÖFB had been abolished, resulting in the nation's withdrawal from the World Cup. Instead,  the German team would represent the former Austrian territory. Theoretically, a united team could have been an even stronger force than each of the separate ones, but German coach Sepp Herberger had little time and very few matches to prepare and merge the very different styles of play and attitude. The former Austrian professionals outplayed the rather athletic yet amateur players of the "Old Empire" in a "reunification" derby that was supposed to finish as a draw, yet in the waning minutes, the Austrians scored twice, with Matthias Sindelar also demonstratively missing the German goal, and subsequently declining to be capped for Germany. 

In a later rematch, the Germans took revenge, winning 9–1. In early April, Herberger inquired whether two separate teams could enter anyway, but "Reichssportführer" Hans von Tschammer und Osten made clear that he expected to see a 5:6 or 6:5 ratio of players from the two hitherto teams. As a result, five players from Austria Wien, Rapid Wien and Vienna Wien were part of the team that only managed a 1–1 draw in Round 1 against Switzerland, which required a rematch. With Rapid Wien's forward Hans Pesser having been sent off, and not satisfied with two others, Herberger had to alter the line-up on six positions to fulfill the 6:5 quota again. The all-German team led the Swiss 2–0 after 15 minutes, but eventually lost 4–2 in Paris in front of a rather anti-German French and Swiss crowd, as few German supporters were able to travel to France due to German restrictions on foreign currency exchange.

After World War II

After World War II, Austria was again separated from Germany. Austria's best result came in 1954 with a team starring midfielder Ernst Ocwirk. They lost in the semi-finals 6–1 to eventual champions Germany, but finished third after beating defending champions Uruguay 3–1. Over the years, a strong yet mainly lopsided rivalry with Germany developed.

At the 1958 World Cup in Sweden, the Austrian team was a disappointment. Defeats to the eventual champions Brazil, the emerging Soviet Union and a draw against a weakened England (who were rebuilding after the loss of several of their key players due to the Munich air disaster) prevented the team from reaching the next round. Still holding to the great popularity in the country, under new coach Decker they again made an international sensation in the era. In front of a record crowd of over 90,000 spectators, made possible by the expansion of Prater Stadium, the team could beat the Soviet Union 3–1 and Spain 3–0. However, due to lack of money, Austria decided not to participate at the 1962 World Cup in Chile, and the team fell apart. The abrupt end of Austria's success in the post-war period led to the clear 0–6 loss against Czechoslovakia in 1962, from which many players and also Karl Decker did not recover.

After the end of Decker era, the team was unable for a long time to connect to the old successes; these were limited mostly only to surprise victories in individual games. Due to the great popularity of the Austrian team, on 20 October 1965, Austria succeeded as the third team of the continent to defeat England at home. Two goals in a 3–2 victory were achieved by Toni Fritsch, who was then nicknamed "Wembley Toni". However, in the same year, Austria failed for the first time to qualify for the World Cup in the 1966 edition, ending third against a still-strong Hungary and East Germany; they only earned a draw. In the summer of 1968, Leopold Šťastný, the successful Slovak coach of Wacker Innsbruck, took over the national team. Despite failing to qualify for the 1970 World Cup, the new coach emphasized developing new players rather than relying on the old guard. Supported by a large football euphoria, Austria came very close to qualifying for the 1974 World Cup in Germany. The qualifying round was tied for first place between Austria and Sweden, despite tiebreakers based on points and goal difference, therefore a playoff was needed for qualifying, held in Gelsenkirchen. In order to have enough time to prepare, the championship round was suspended and the stadium in Gelsenkirchen was prepared five days before the playoff. On snow-covered ground, Austria lost 1–2, but with numerous missed chances such as hitting the crossbar.

1970s and 1980s
Anchored by Herbert Prohaska and striker Hans Krankl, and backed up by Bruno Pezzey, Austria reached the World Cup in 1978 and 1982 and both times reached the second round, held in team group matches that replaced the knockout quarter-finals. This Austria team, coached by Helmut Senekowitsch, is widely regarded as the best post-World War II Austrian football team ever.

In the 1978 World Cup in Argentina, they had lost two matches and would almost surely finish last in their second round group of four teams, but they put in a special effort for their last game in Córdoba against West Germany, which had still chances of qualifying for the final. The Austrians also denied the defending world champion a trip to the third place match, beating them 3–2 by two goals of Hans Krankl, plus an own goal. The celebrating report of the radio commentator Edi Finger ("I werd narrisch!") became famous in Austria, where it is considered the "Miracle of Cordoba", while the West Germans regard the game and the Austrian behaviour as a disgrace.

During the 1982 World Cup in Spain, Austria and West Germany met again, in the last match of the group stage. Because the other two teams in the group had played their last match the previous day, both teams knew that a West German win by one goal would see both through, while all other results would eliminate one team or the other. After ten minutes of furious attack, Horst Hrubesch scored for West Germany and the two teams mainly kicked the ball around for 80 minutes with few attempts to attack. The match became known as the "non-aggression pact of Gijón". Algeria had also won two matches, including a shocking surprise over West Germany in the opener, but among the three teams that had won two matches, was eliminated based on goal difference, having conceded two late goals in their 3–2 win over Chile. The Algerian supporters were furious, and even the Austrian and West German fans showed themselves to be extremely unhappy with the nature of their progression. As a result of this match, all future tournaments would see the last group matches played simultaneously. Austria and Northern Ireland were eliminated by losing to France in the second round group stage of three teams.

1990s
Led by striker Toni Polster, Austria qualified for the 1990 World Cup but were eliminated in the first round, despite defeating the United States 2–1. Much worse was the stunning 1–0 loss against the Faroe Islands, a team made of amateurs, in the qualifying campaign for the 1992 European Championship, considered  the worst embarrassment in any Austrian team sport ever, and one of the biggest upsets in footballing history. The game was played in Landskrona, Sweden, because there were no grass fields on the Faroe Islands. It was a sign for things to come. Austria suffered another couple of years of botched qualifying campaigns, despite playing some entertaining football in the closing stages of UEFA Euro 1996 qualification.

In the 1998 World Cup, Austria were drawn in Group B alongside Italy, Cameroon and Chile. Their appearance was brief but eventful, as they managed the curious feat of only scoring in stoppage time in each of their matches. Against Cameroon, Pierre Njanka's goal was cancelled out by Toni Polster's late strike. In their second match, it was Ivica Vastić who curled a last minute equalizer, cancelling out Marcelo Salas' disputed opener. Austria were not so fortunate in their crucial, final match at the Stade de France. Italy scored twice after half-time: a header from Christian Vieri and a tap-in from Roberto Baggio. Andi Herzog's stoppage time penalty kept up Austria's unusual scoring pattern, but was not enough to prevent Austria finishing third in the group, behind the Italians and Chileans.

21st century

2000: Decline

After 1998, Austria began to decline. They failed to qualify for the 2002 World Cup and Euro 2000, and suffered embarrassment (similar to the Faroe Islands loss) when they lost 9–0 to Spain and 5–0 to Israel in 1999. In 2006, Josef Hickersberger became coach of the Austria national team, which included some respectable results such as a 1–0 victory against Switzerland in 2006.

Austria qualified automatically for Euro 2008 as co-hosts. Their first major tournament in a decade, most commentators regarded them as outsiders and whipping-boys for Germany, Croatia and Poland in the group stage. Many of their home supporters were in agreement and 10,000 Austrians signed a petition demanding Austria withdraw from the tournament to spare the nation's embarrassment. However, Austria performed better than expected. They managed a 1–1 draw with Poland and lost 1–0 to both favoured Croatia and Germany.

Shortly after Austria's first-round exit from the tournament, Hickersberger resigned as the national team coach. Karel Brückner, who had resigned as head coach of the Czech Republic after that country's first round exit from Euro 2008, was soon named as his replacement. After only eight months, Brückner was released in March 2009 and the position was subsequently taken by Didi Constantini.

2010s: Revival and decline 

In the qualifying campaign for Euro 2012, the Austrians played against Kazakhstan, Azerbaijan, Belgium, Turkey and Germany.

Over the next few years, the Austrian team saw a major renaissance. A number of players from the 2007 U-20 team that finished fourth in the World Cup that year ended up developing and becoming full starters for the senior squad, including Sebastian Prödl, Markus Suttner, Martin Harnik, Veli Kavlak, Erwin Hoffer, Zlatko Junuzović and Rubin Okotie.

The team failed to qualify for the 2014 World Cup in Brazil, but finished in third place with a 5–2–3 record with 17 points and a +10 goal difference in their qualifying group. There were a number of notable results, such as home victories over the Republic of Ireland and Sweden, as well as a narrow home defeat to Germany and a 2–2 draw in Ireland in the rematch.

The Euro 2016 qualifying campaign was even more successful. Again, the Austrians battled and drew with the Swedes 1–1, before beating the same opponent in a 4–1 win right in Swedish soil. Austria also beat Russia twice both home and away with the score 1–0. Austria also recorded a pair of victories over Moldova (2–1 in Chișinău) and Montenegro (1–0 in Vienna). Rubin Okotie scored the deciding goal in the closing 20 minutes of the match after a previous Austrian goal a minute before was controversially disallowed. A week later, the team played a friendly away game against favored Brazil, losing 2–1. Austria finished its Euro 2016 qualifying campaign by topping the group undefeated, leading the Austrians to be enthusiastic over a new golden generation to begin.

However, despite this successful performance in qualification, the tournament itself turned out to be a complete nightmare for the Austrians. Austria was grouped in group F with Hungary, Portugal and Iceland, and was tipped favorite to progress. Austria however, opened their campaign with a shocking 0–2 loss to its neighbor Hungary, in which defender Aleksandar Dragović was sent off. This was followed up by an encouraging 0–0 draw to Portugal, in which Cristiano Ronaldo missed a penalty. Nonetheless, Austria ended up losing 1–2 to debutant Iceland and was shockingly eliminated with just a point. This failure blew up the myth of a new golden generation for many Austrians.

Austria would later participate in Group D of 2018 World Cup qualification along with Wales, Serbia, Ireland, Georgia and Moldova. However, the previous nightmare in UEFA Euro had a great impact on the Austrian side, and Austria ended the qualification in 4th place in the group, failing to qualify for the 2018 FIFA World Cup.

2020s: European Championship knockout stages 
Austria was drawn into UEFA Euro 2020 qualifying Group G alongside Poland, North Macedonia, Slovenia, Israel and Latvia. Austria struggled in the first few games after a loss to Poland at home and a shocking loss to Israel and another to minnows Latvia. As the group became more competitive, Austria won six of the last nine game matches and finished second in the group with nineteen points. Marko Arnautović led the team in most goals and tied Robert Lewandowski with nine goals. Austria qualified for their third European Championship Finals. It was also the second time Austria qualified for a major tournament consecutively since back to back since the 1954 and 1958 World Cup.

Austria was drawn into UEFA Euro 2020 Group C alongside the Netherlands, Ukraine and debutants North Macedonia. Austria kicked off the opener with a 3–1 victory against North Macedonia. It was the first win for Austria at a European Championship and first time scoring more than one goal in a group stage game. In the final group stage match, Austria needed a win to secure second place and defeated Ukraine 1–0. Austria finished second in the group and it was the first time they've progressed to the knockout stages at European Championships. They faced Italy in the round of 16 at Wembley Stadium and lost 2–1 after extra time with Sasa Kalajdzic scoring their only goal of the game in the 114th minute.

Rivalry

The match-up between Austria and Hungary is the second most-played international match in football; only Argentina and Uruguay, another two neighboring countries, have met each other in more matches. It is also notable in which both countries are the first European, non-British countries to play international matches, three full decades after the first ever international football match.

Recent and forthcoming fixtures

2022

2023

Players

Current squad
The following players were called up for the UEFA Euro 2024 qualifying against Azerbaijan and Estonia on 24 and 27 March 2023, respectively.

Caps and goals as of 20 November 2022, after match against .

Recent call-ups

The following players have also been called up to the Austria squad in the last twelve months and are still eligible for selection.

 INJ

PRE Player was named to the preliminary squad
COV Player withdrew from the squad due to COVID-19
INJ Player withdrew from the squad due to an injury
WD Player withdrew from the squad due to non-injury issue
RET Retired from international football
SUS Suspended in official matches

Staff
 President: Gerhard Milletich
 Director of Sport: Peter Schöttel
 Head coach: Ralf Rangnick
 Assistant coaches: Lars Kornetka, Peter Perchtold, Onur Cinel
 Goalkeeper coach: Robert Almer

Player statistics

 
 after the match against .
Players in bold are still active in the national team.

Most capped players

Top goalscorers

Manager history

, after the match against .

1912–1945

1945–1999

2000–present

Competitive record

FIFA World Cup

UEFA European Championship

UEFA Nations League

All-time head-to-head record

, after the match against .

Honours

Official
 FIFA World Cup
  Third place: 1954

 Olympic Games
  Silver Medal: 1936

 Central European International Cup
 Winners: 1931-32

See also

 Austria women's national football team
 Austria men's national under-21 football team
 Austria men's national under-19 football team
 Austria men's national under-17 football team

Notes

References

External links

 
 FIFA profile
 UEFA profile
 RSSSF archive of results 1902–2003
 RSSSF archive of coaches 1902–1999
 Austria national football team /Ambrosius Kutschera/

Austria national football team
European national association football teams
Football in Austria